Agrostis exarata is a species of grass known by the common names spike bentgrass, spike bent, Pacific bentgrass, and spike redtop. It is native to western North America from Texas to the Aleutian Islands.

Description

It reproduces mainly by seed, but it can also spread via rhizome. This bunchgrass occurs in many plant communities in varied climates. It is considered good forage for livestock.

References

External links
Calflora Database: Agrostis exarata (Spike redtop,  spike bentgrass)
Jepson Manual eFlora (TJM2) treatment of Agrostis exarata
The Grass Manual on the Web: Treatment of Agrostis + Agrostis exarata
USFS: Fire ecology of Agrostis exarata
UC Photos gallery — Agrostis exarata

exarata
Bunchgrasses of North America
Grasses of the United States
Grasses of Canada
Grasses of Mexico
Native grasses of California
Native grasses of Texas
Flora of Northwestern Mexico
Flora of the Western United States
Flora of Western Canada
Flora of Alaska
Flora of the Cascade Range
Flora of the Rocky Mountains
Flora of the Sierra Nevada (United States)
Natural history of the California chaparral and woodlands